Hemming is the debut studio album by American musician Hemming. It was released on July 24, 2015, in the United States, through Custard Records.

Critical reception
Curve magazine summarized the album as "strong and raw".

Track listing

References

2015 debut albums
Custard Records albums
Albums produced by Linda Perry